Bič may refer to:
Bić, a mountain on the border of Serbia and Bosnia and Herzegovina
Bič, Slovenia, a village in the Trebnje municipality in eastern Slovenia